Ignacio Uría Mendizábal (4 January 1938 – 3 December 2008) was a Spanish Basque businessman and head of construction company, Altuna y Uría.

Death
Uría was shot dead on 3 December 2008 outside a restaurant. The attack was blamed on ETA. He had received threats from ETA. Uría had been working on a high-speed train route between the Basque Country and Madrid. ETA threatened several companies and their workers involved in the train project as it viewed such construction as an imposition on the Basque Country by the Spanish and French governments.

See also
List of unsolved murders

References

1937 births
2008 deaths
Businesspeople from the Basque Country (autonomous community)
Deaths by firearm in Spain
Male murder victims
People from Azpeitia
People killed by ETA (separatist group)
People murdered in Spain
20th-century Spanish businesspeople
Spanish murder victims
Spanish terrorism victims
Unsolved murders in Spain